Amblada was a town of ancient Lycaonia or of Pisidia, inhabited in Hellenistic, Roman, and Byzantine times. It was the seat of a bishop; no longer a residential see, it remains a titular see of the Roman Catholic Church. Strabo places it in Pisidia; the bishopric was suffragan to the metropolitan of Lycaonia. The coin minted copper coins during the period of the Antonines and their successors, with the epigraph Ἀμβλαδέων.

Its site is located near , Seydişehir, Konya Province, Turkey.

References

Populated places in ancient Lycaonia
Populated places in Pisidia
Former populated places in Turkey
Roman towns and cities in Turkey
Populated places of the Byzantine Empire
Catholic titular sees in Asia
History of Konya Province